Cyperus floridanus is a species of sedge that is native to southern parts of North America and the Caribbean.

See also 
 List of Cyperus species

References 

floridanus
Plants described in 1903
Taxa named by Nathaniel Lord Britton
Flora of Florida
Flora of Cuba
Flora of the Bahamas
Flora of the Dominican Republic
Flora of Jamaica
Flora of Puerto Rico
Flora without expected TNC conservation status